Liyeh Chak (also Romanized as Līyeh Chāk) is a village in Pir Kuh Rural District, Deylaman District, Siahkal County, Gilan Province, Iran. At the 2006 census, its population was 51, in 11 families.

References 

Populated places in Siahkal County